The Letran Knights are the collegiate varsity teams representing Colegio de San Juan de Letran in the National Collegiate Athletic Association. The collegiate women's varsity teams are called the Lady Knights, while the high school varsity teams are called the Squires.

The college's varsity teams also participate in other sports leagues such as the Filoil Flying V Preseason Cup, Fr. Martin's Cup, Premier Volleyball League, Milcu Got Skills Inter School, among others.

Athletic history

The very first athletic varsity team in Letran began in 1911 when the vice-rector, Rev. Fr. Juan Sanchez, O.P., organized Letran Athletic Club, with the objective of strengthening the solidarity and fraternity among the students and alumni and for the development of the youth by introducing different kinds of sports. The following were named Honorary Presidents: The very Rev. Fr Rector, Calixto Proeto, O.P., Justices Cayetano Arellano and Manuel Araullo and Manila City Engineer Emilio Quisumbing who had previously served as President.

In 1917, the Liga Catolica (the Catholic League), the immediate predecessor of the National Collegiate Athletic Association (NCAA) among the sectarian schools, was founded and lasted until 1920. The members were Letran, San Beda, Ateneo, De La Salle, San Vicente de Paul, and UST. Football was a major sports event and basketball was also played.

In 1928, Letran formally joined the NCAA, which was founded in 1924. Letran adopted the Knights monicker after its founder, Spanish officer Don Juan Geronimo Guerrero, who was a Knight of Malta. That same year the team’s very first NCAA crown won in the midgets division (now the juniors) of basketball tournament, then retaining the crown in 1929 and 1930.

Letran withdrew from the NCAA in 1933 as a form of protest for the unjust decision of the league management during the Letran-Ateneo basketball game. The team then re-joined the league in 1936.

Since joining the NCAA and the establishment of the NCAA general championship in 1960, Letran has won 9 NCAA general championships in the seniors division, while 8 general championship titles have won in the juniors division.

Varsity Teams
 Basketball
Football
 Volleyball
 Tennis
Badminton
 Table Tennis
 Track and Field
 Taekwondo
 Chess
Swimming

Basketball

Letran was one of the institutions who formed the first interschool league in the Philippines, the Liga Catolica, in 1917 until 1920. When Letran College joined the NCAA in 1928, the juniors basketball team won their first championship, and then followed with two consecutive titles, establishing the very first three-peat championships in the league.

In the NCAA, they have the second most number of combined basketball championships, with 31 titles.

The seniors’ team have won 19 NCAA championships, while their juniors’ counterpart have 12 championships. The Knights’ most recent championship was in 2021-22 season, while the Squires’ most recent championship was in 2001-02 season.

Volleyball

Women's volleyball 
The Lady Knights volleyball team have won a total of 8 NCAA championships. The Lady Knights debuted in the NCAA in 1977 and were  coached by Herminio "Boggs" Rivera. On that same year, they won their very first NCAA championship. Dubbed as the "Magnificent Seven" because the team was composed of only seven players instead of the usual twelve, the team was bannered by team captain Alicia "Chit" Abuel, Donna Tengson, Melba Gan, Nancy Gan, Ressie Garcia, Ernestina Cristobal, and Otchie Arandia. The Lady Knights then later captured four more consecutive titles in 1978-1981.

The women's team last won back-to-back titles in 1997–98 and 1998–99 seasons, bannered by the Carolino sisters, Michelle and Mayette, who then later joined the national team.

Current roster 
NCAA Season 97

Men's volleyball team
The Letran Knights men's volleyball team have won a total of 13 NCAA championships. Their first championship was won during the 1981–82 season.

The men's volleyball team last won the title during the 2009–2010 season bannered by Peter Warren Pirante, Erickson Ramos, and Renz Ordonez.

Current roster 
NCAA Season 95

Beach volleyball

Notable players
Women's Division
Michelle Carolino
– member of the Philippine National Team who has won a lot of most valuable player awards, and Best Attacker and Best Scorer in both the NCAA (Philippines) league & Shakey's V - League
Marietta Carolino
– sister of Michelle Carolino, member of the Philippine National Team who has won a lot of MVP awards, as well as Best Attacker and Best Scorer in both the NCAA (Philippines) league & Shakey's V - League.

Juniors' Division
Raxel Redd Catris
– NCAA Season 93 Best Libero
John Paulo Lorenzo
– NCAA Season 93 Best Opposite Spiker

Taekwondo

Notable players 

 Roberto Cruz - six-time SEA Games gold medalist, 2000 Olympian

 Ramil Abratique - 1988 National Team, 1990 SEA Games bronze medalist, 1991 10th World Taekwondo Championships silver medalist, 1991 SEA Games gold medalist, 1993 SEA Games bronze medalist

Track and Field

Notable players 

 Susano Erang - 1977 SEA Games (silver - shot put), 1983 SEA Games (bronze - shot put), 

 Archand Christian Bagsit - 2011 SEA Games (silver - 400m & gold - 4x400m relay), 2013 SEA Games (gold - 400m & 4x400m relay), 2015 SEA Games (silver - 4x400m relay), 2017 SEA Games (bronze - 4x400m relay & 4x100m relay)

Association football

History
Letran College had organized its own football team in 1910, known as the Letran Athletic Association. The team, nicknamed "The Bohemians", won the national championship in the years up to 1917. Team was led by Joaquín Loyzaga Sr. and Letran Football Hall of Famer, Joaquin Lopez. Then, it joined the La Liga Catolica where it competed against other Catholic schools. The Letran Booters joined the NCAA in 1932.

The Letran Booters won several titles in the NCAA, most notably during the 1980s, when they beat a favored Mapua team with Taiwanese and foreign-bred players.

In season 2002, its juniors team, the Letran Squires, won the NCAA title in a clean sweep manner, beating everyone and winning all of their matches. The title was won in dramatic fashion, as the final match against PCU went into extra time, and letran scoring the golden goal to clinch the title. During this season, the Letran Squires only managed to concede one goal in the whole competition.  This team was coached by Bernie Cordero and Perival Acabado and a double MVP award were given to Bobby Durano (Forward) and Bryan Alvarez (Attacking Midfield).

Due to financial restraints, Letran College discontinued the seniors football program in 2003. In 2018, the seniors football team was re-established.

Notable players
Antonio "Tony" Chua - Juniors and Seniors Division (The first Filipino Football player to play in the Japanese Football League)

Chess 
Letran has a total of 20 NCAA chess championship titles, second to San Sebastian with 23 titles. In the seniors division, the Knights have won six championships. Their last championship run was during the 2009-10 season, where they beat the two-time defending champions CSB Blazers. Letran's Chester Brian Guerrero was named Most Valuable Player.

In the juniors division, the Squires have won 14 NCAA titles, the most in the league. Their last championship was during the 2017-2018 season, winning back-to-back titles.

Swimming 
The Letran swimming team is called the Aqua Knights. The seniors' team last won the NCAA championship in 1986-87 season, while the juniors' team last won the title in 1985-86 season. Both the seniors and juniors team have won two titles each.

Championships
Letran was NCAA champion during the following seasons:

 Basketball
 Seniors: 1938-1939, 1950-1951, 1960-1961, 1966-1967, 1970-1971, 1979-1980, 1982-1983, 1983-1984, 1984-1985, 1986-1987, 1987-1988, 1992-1993, 1998-1999, 1999-2000, 2003-2004, 2005-2006, 2015-2016, 2019-2020, 2021-2022
 Juniors: 1928-1929, 1929-1930, 1930-1931, 1931-1932, 1948-1949, 1957-1958, 1975-1976, 1979-1980, 1983-1984, 1985-1986, 1990-1991, 2001-2002

 Volleyball
 Men: 1981-1982, 1982–1983, 1983–1984, 1990–1991, 1991–1992, 1992–1993, 1993–1994, 1998–1999, 1999–2000, 2000–2001, 2007–2008, 2008–2009, 2009–2010
 Women: 1977-1978, 1978–1979, 1979–1980, 1980–1981, 1997–1998, 1998–1999
 Juniors: 1985-1986, 2001–2002, 2003–2004, 2004–2005
Beach Volleyball
Men: 2008-2009, 2009-2010
Women: 2003-2004,2022
Football
Seniors: 1983-1984, 1985–1986, 1986–1987, 1988–1989, 1997–1998
Juniors: 1965-1966, 1987–1988, 1988–1989, 2001–2002
 Softball
 Seniors: 1978-1979, 1979–1980
 Swimming
 Seniors: 1940-41, 1986-1987
 Juniors: 1983-1984, 1985–1986
 Tennis
 Seniors: 1976-1976, 1984–1985, 1985–1986, 1999–2000, 2000–2001, 2001–2002
 Juniors: 1982-1983, 1998–1999, 1999–2000, 2001–2002
 Table Tennis
 Seniors: 1985-1986, 1989–1990, 2000–2001, 2001–2002, 2002–2003, 2003–2004
 Juniors: 1986-1987, 1987–1988, 1988–1989, 1989–1990, 1990–1991, 1991–1992, 1997–1998, 1998–1999, 1999–2000, 2000–2001, 2001–2002
 Women's: 1998-1999,1999–2000,2001–2002,2002–2003,2003–2004
 Track & Field
 Seniors: 1978-1979, 1989–1990, 1997–1998, 1998–1999, 1999–2000
 Juniors: 1984-1985, 1986–1987, 2001–2001, 2001–2002, 2007–2008
 Chess
 Seniors: 1978-1979, 1979–1980, 1981–1982, 1985–1986, 2003-2004, 2009-2010
 Juniors: 1983-1984, 1987–1988, 1999–2000, 2000–2001, 2001–2002
 General Championships:
 Seniors: 1979, 1997, 1998, 1999, 2000, 2001, 2002, 2003, 2009
 Juniors: 1983, 1985, 1986, 1987, 1999, 2000, 2001, 2002

References

Former Philippine Basketball League teams
National Collegiate Athletic Association (Philippines) teams
College sports teams in Metro Manila
Colegio de San Juan de Letran